Veni Vidi Vici is the debut album from punk rock band The Forgotten. It is their second release under TKO Records, overall release No. 12 by the label itself. It was released in 1998 on blue vinyl and CD, re-released in 2000 on black vinyl. It contains the band's most popular song "Fists Up".

Track listing

Personnel
Gordy Carbone – Lead vocals 
Craig Fairbaugh – Guitar, Vocals
Ken Helwig – Bass guitar, Vocals 
Todd Loomis – Drums

Artwork 
Album Cover Art – Robert Klem
Photography (Back Photo) – Trish Leeper
Photography (Band Photo 1) – Corey Buckingham
Photography (Band Photo 2 Thru 4) – Trish Leeper
Photography (Thanks Photo) – Prozak

Production
Lars Frederiksen – Producer
Brett Tyson – Engineer

References

1998 debut albums
The Forgotten (band) albums